Al Muthanna University is an Iraqi university located in Samawah, Al Muthanna Province, Iraq. It was established in 2007.

Colleges
College of Agriculture
College of Education
College of Science
College of engineering (chemical engineering, civil engineering, Architecture )
College of medicine
College of Law
College of Nursing
college of veterinary medicine
College of Dentistry
College of Basic Education
College of Physical Education
College of Administration and Economics
College of Pharmacy
College of Pure science

External links
Official website 

Muthanna
Educational institutions established in 2007
2007 establishments in Iraq